John H. Collins may refer to:

 John H. Collins (director) (1889–1918), American director and screenwriter
 John H. Collins (academic) (1902–1981), American classical scholar

See also
 John Collins (disambiguation)